Veronika Sabolová (born March 20, 1980, in Košice) is a Slovak luger who has competed since 1995. Competing in three Winter Olympics, she earned her best finish of 14th in the women's singles event at Vancouver in 2010.

Sabolová's best finish at the FIL World Luge Championships was tenth in the women's singles event at Nagano in 2004. Her best finish at the FIL European Luge Championships was 13th in the women's singles event at Oberhof in 2004.

References

External links
 
 

1980 births
Living people
Slovak female lugers
Olympic lugers of Slovakia
Lugers at the 2002 Winter Olympics
Lugers at the 2006 Winter Olympics
Lugers at the 2010 Winter Olympics
Sportspeople from Košice